The ballon au poing is a popular team sport in Picardy (France). This game is played by teams of six. It is a game of gain-ground.

This sport must not be confused with the fistball.

To be able to hit the ball, players surround their hand and their wrist with a strip of canvas or leather.

The teams are separated on the ground by a line ( la corde - the rope) which is mobile during the party. This new limit is shown by a chasse.

The purpose of the game is to gain ground by moving the rope. To do it, we try to make the ball "die" in the opposite camp.

Points mark by 15, 30, 40 and game.

Each 15 August at the Parc de la Hotoie ( Amiens ), the city receives the final stages of Ballon au poing.

See also 
Others games of gain-ground

Notes 
  Luc Collard, Longue paume et ballon au poing, revue EPS, n° 274, p. 72-75, nov-déc 1998

External links
 Ballon au poing on french-wikiversity
 www.jeuxpicards.org
  Caron Gilles , LE BALLON AU POING : COUPES DE FRANCE de 1991 à 2019 - CHAMPIONNATS EN SALLE de 1994 à 2019, 38 pages

Games of gain-ground
Handball sports
Team sports
Sports originating in France